Toshikatsu Yamamoto (Yamamoto Toshikatsu) (born 15 December 1929 Nichinan, Miyazaki Prefecture, Japan) is a physician who worked in the field of acupuncture.

Toshikatsu Yamamoto graduated in 1956 from his studies of medicine at the Nippon Medical School in Tokyo. After that he gained qualification in surgery, anesthesia, and obstetrics in New Jersey, New York and Cologne, Germany. In 1966 he went back to his home country and founded a hospital.

During the 1960s he developed Yamamoto New Scalp Acupuncture (YNSA). In 1991 he graduated from the University of Miyazaki with the research for scalp acupuncture. In 1998 he founded the Yamamoto Rehabilitation Clinic in Miyazaki.

Bibliography 
 Yamamoto, Toshikatsu, Yamamoto Neue Schädelakupunktur. Kötzting/Bayer. Wald,  (1985, 1991 & 2004).
 Yamamoto, Toshikatsu, Yamamoto new scalp acupuncture, DVD-Video (2005).

External links 
 
 Aishinkai Yamamoto Hospital (Japanese)
 YNSA
 Yamamoto Scalp Acupuncture (Japanese)

Acupuncturists
1929 births
Living people
People from Miyazaki Prefecture